The 1980 United States presidential election in Oregon took place on November 4, 1980. All fifty states and The District of Columbia were part of the 1980 United States presidential election. Voters chose six electors to the Electoral College, who voted for president and vice president.

Oregon had voted in 1976 for incumbent President Gerald Ford over challenger Carter in the previous election by an extremely narrow margin of just 1,713 votes, but had been George McGovern’s sixth-strongest state during his 1972 2,900-plus-county landslide loss.

Both Carter and Reagan won the Democratic and Republican presidential primaries held during the third week of May 1980. In August early in Carter's campaign, he targeted Oregon as a state he might win despite having supported only one Democrat since 1944, on the basis that independent candidate and Reagan primary rival John B. Anderson would split the GOP vote.

The last week of September saw all three leading candidates visit the Beaver State, and at the end of the month Reagan was shown as ahead by around five percentage points, after having been in the lead in Oregon ever since the first polls were taken in mid-September.

October saw Vice-President Walter Mondale doing extensive campaigning in the state, and with polls showing Anderson winning over fifteen percent of the state's ballots and strong support for the Equal Rights Amendment opposed by Reagan, the Democrats possessed substantial hope in the state. By the last week of October, Carter's spokesmen were confident they could crack a state whose loss four years previously they attributed to the presence of Eugene McCarthy on the ballot, but in the days before the poll sample votes swung towards Reagan again.

Oregon was ultimately won by former California Governor Ronald Reagan (R) by 9.66%. Reagan dominated in the conservative, populist eastern interior and Rogue Valley, where he won a majority in every county, and Carter, despite carrying four counties, did not win a majority in any due to a strong vote west of the Cascades for Anderson, who reached double figures in all Willamette Valley counties except Columbia and Linn. This was the first time the Republicans had carried Coos County since Dwight D. Eisenhower in 1952. , this is the last election in which Lane County voted for a Republican presidential candidate.

Primaries

Results

Results by county

See also
 United States presidential elections in Oregon
 Presidency of Ronald Reagan

References

Oregon
1980
1980 Oregon elections